The Joint Statistical Meetings (JSM) is a professional conference/academic conference for statisticians held annually every year since 1840 (usually in August). Billed as "the largest gathering of statisticians held in North America", JSM has attracted over 5000 participants in recent years. The following statistical societies are designated as official JSM partners:
 the American Statistical Association (ASA)
 the Institute of Mathematical Statistics (IMS)
 two regions of the International Biometric Society (IBS)
 the Eastern North American Region (ENAR)
 the Western North American Region (WNAR)
 the Statistical Society of Canada (SSC)
 International Society for Bayesian Analysis (ISBA)
 International Chinese Statistical Association (ICSA)
 International Indian Statistical Association (IISA)
 Korean International Statistical Society (KISS)
The founding members of JSM were the ASA, IMS, IBS, and SSC.

In addition to committee meetings, JSM activities include
 a career placement service
 continuing education courses
 oral presentations
 panel sessions
 plenary sessions
 poster sessions

Future Meetings

Past Meetings
Since 1978 when attendance figures were first reported.

References

External links
Joint Statistical Meetings
 Joint Statistical Meetings Defined on Google
Other Abbreviations for JSM

Statistical societies
Mathematics conferences